Kate Baines (born 18 July 1978) is an English actress, born in Doncaster. She has appeared in the Channel 4 British soap opera's Hollyoaks (as Beth Morgan #2), Coronation Street and Emmerdale (as Joanne). Kate has also appeared in dramas including At Home with the Braithwaites, Peak Practice and City Central. In June 2020, she appeared in an episode of the BBC soap opera Doctors as Claire Mortimer.

Baines trained at Bretton Hall College and gained a BA (Hons) in Performing Arts (1996–1999). She has also appeared in many stage plays and regularly performs for the Hull Truck Theatre Company.

References

External links 
 
 Maxim Interview 2003

1978 births
English soap opera actresses
English stage actresses
Living people